The Last Eunuch of China: The Life of Sun Yaoting  is a 1992 biography by Chinese writer Jia Yinghua. This book depicts the entire real life of Sun Yaoting, the last imperial eunuch of China, from his entry into the imperial palace to his old age. As a person close to the emperor, the empress, and imperial concubines, he participated in royal court politics and witnessed extraordinary events, like the expulsion of Puyi from the royal palace, and his re-emergence as monarch of the puppet regime in Manchuria. He saw the last royal palace's extravagant lifestyle, experienced the breakdown of the last imperial dynasty, and felt the new changes brought by the new age. The Last Eunuch of China was partially translated into 15 foreign languages and published overseas. An English translation was published in 2008.

From a cross-generation friend's perspective, the author honestly tells readers about life in the royal palace, the imperial gossip, and secrets of eunuchs in the eyes of a eunuch. He also genuinely displays the mindset and destinies of this special group in that special period of time.

References

Biographies about politicians
1992 non-fiction books